The Alfa Romeo P2 won the inaugural Automobile World Championship in 1925, taking victory in two of the four championship rounds when Antonio Ascari drove it in the European Grand Prix at Spa and Gastone Brilli-Peri won the Italian Grand Prix at Monza after Ascari died while leading the intervening race at Montlhery.

Although 1925 brought drastic changes of regulations, from 1924 to 1930 the P2 was victorious in 14 Grands Prix and major events including the Targa Florio. It was one of the iconic Grand Prix cars of the 1920s, along with the Bugatti Type 35, and enabled Alfa Romeo, as world champions, to incorporate the laurel wreath into their logo.

The car was the first creation of Alfa's new designer Vittorio Jano who had been recruited from Fiat by Enzo Ferrari when Nicola Romeo scrapped the P1 after its poor performance in the 1923 Monza Grand Prix against Fiat. The P2 was powered by Alfa's first straight-8 cylinder supercharged engine with 2 carburettors placed after the compressor.

Only 2 of the 6 original models survive, and they can be seen in the Alfa Romeo Museum in Arese and the Turin Automobile Museum. The P2 had two body styles using either a cut off or long rear.

One of the P2s was featured on the main sculpture at the 2010 Goodwood Festival of Speed.

Major victories

References

External links
The Golden Age by Leif Snellman

Grand Prix cars
P2 1924-30 Grand Prix racer
Cars introduced in 1924
Winner